Andreas Hjelm (born March 3, 1988) is a Swedish ice hockey defenceman. He is currently playing with Södertälje SK of the HockeyAllsvenskan (Allsv).

Hjelm made his Swedish Hockey League debut playing with Luleå HF during the 2013–14 SHL season.

References

External links

1988 births
Living people
AIK IF players
Luleå HF players
Södertälje SK players
Storhamar Dragons players
Swedish ice hockey defencemen
Ice hockey people from Stockholm